Yardam (Yarźam) is a rural locality (a village) in Kuzeyevsky Selsoviet, Buzdyaksky District, Bashkortostan, Russia. The population was 10 as of 2010. There is 1 street.

Geography 
Yardam is located 46 km north of Buzdyak (the district's administrative centre) by road. Chishma is the nearest rural locality.

References 

Rural localities in Buzdyaksky District